Jarosław Marycz (born 17 April 1987) is a Polish road bicycle racer, who most recently rode for UCI Continental Team .

Biography
Born in Koszalin, Marycz turned professional with the UCI Professional Continental team  in 2008. In 2009, Marycz was leading the European U-23 road racing championships in a breakaway near the end of the race, but was caught 20 meters from the finish line by Kris Boeckmans, finishing second.

In 2010, he moved to UCI ProTeam . After three seasons with the team, his contract was not renewed. Marycz joined the  team for the 2013 season, on a one-year contract. He remained with the team for a second season in 2014.

He rode in the 2015 Giro d'Italia, but did not finish stage 12.

Major results

2005
 2nd Overall Giro della Lunigiana
1st Stage 2
 4th Time trial, UCI Juniors World Championships
 10th Road race, UEC European Junior Road Championships
2006
 8th GP Demy-Cars
2007
 2nd Piccola Coppa Agostoni
 3rd Coppa Città di Asti
 4th Trofeo Città di Brescia
 7th Overall Tour du Loir-et-Cher
1st Stage 4
 7th Overall Flèche du Sud
2008
 1st  Time trial, National Under-23 Road Championships
 1st Tour de Berne
 1st Trofeo Alcide Degasperi
 1st GP Inda
 3rd La Roue Tourangelle
 3rd Coppa della Pace
 3rd Grand Prix Cristal Energie
 4th GP Capodarco
 6th Classic Loire Atlantique
 9th Trofeo Internazionale Bastianelli
 9th Trofeo Marini Silvano Cappelli
2009
 1st  Time trial, National Under-23 Road Championships
 1st Coppa G. Romita
 1st Stage 3 (ITT) Okolo Slovenska
 2nd  Road race, UEC European Under-23 Road Championships
 4th Trofeo Città di San Vendemiano
 4th Trofeo Alcide Degasperi
 5th Trofeo Edil C
2010
 1st  Time trial, National Road Championships
2012
 National Road Championships
4th Road race
6th Time trial
 8th Grand Prix d'Isbergues
2013
 5th Time trial, National Road Championships
 10th Overall Szlakiem Grodów Piastowskich
2014
 1st Overall Dookoła Mazowsza
1st Stage 1 (TTT)
 6th Time trial, National Road Championships
 9th Overall Szlakiem Grodów Piastowskich
 10th ProRace Berlin
2015
 1st Stage 1b (TTT) Settimana Internazionale di Coppi e Bartali
2016
 5th London–Surrey Classic
 6th Time trial, National Road Championships
2017
 1st Stage 2 Dookoła Mazowsza
2018
 9th Memorial Grundmanna I Wizowskiego
 9th Grand Prix Minsk

References

External links

1987 births
Living people
Polish male cyclists
People from Koszalin
Sportspeople from West Pomeranian Voivodeship